Le signore (i.e. "The ladies") is a 1960 Italian comedy film directed  by Turi Vasile and starring Chelo Alonso and Nadia Gray.

Plot

Cast 
  
 Chelo Alonso as Rosario
 Nadia Gray as  Tatjana Baker
 Liana Orfei as Patrizia Viotti
 Irène Tunc as  Eva
 Bice Valori as  Nora
 Enrico Maria Salerno as Renato, aka René
 Paolo Ferrari as Giorgio
 Livio Lorenzon as  Mario
 Francesco Mulé as  Ercole
 Paolo Panelli as  Attilio Brando
 Antonella Steni as Ninetta, Renato's wife
 Giampiero Littera as  Maurotto
  Eleonora Morana as  Irene
 Mario Carotenuto as  Serafino 
 Fernanda Pasqui as  Giulietta, Attilio's wife
 Miranda Campa as The True Eva
 Daniele Vargas as  Andrea
 Gianni Bonagura 
 Alberto Bonucci   
 Franco Fantasia  
 Giovanna Galletti  
 Ciccio Barbi

See also
List of Italian films of 1960

References

External links

Italian comedy films
1960 comedy films
1960 films
Titanus films
Italian black-and-white films
1960s Italian-language films
1960s Italian films